Letwell is a civil parish in the Metropolitan Borough of Rotherham, South Yorkshire, England.  The parish contains 17 listed buildings that are recorded in the National Heritage List for England.  Of these, three are listed at Grade II*, the middle of the three grades, and the others are at Grade II, the lowest grade.  The parish contains the village of Letwell and the surrounding countryside.  Apart from Langold Farmhouse and associated structures, all the listed buildings are arranged along the main street of the village, and consist of houses and cottages, a farmhouse and farm buildings, a church, a meeting room, a dovecote, and a telephone kiosk.


Key

Buildings

References

Citations

Sources

 

Lists of listed buildings in South Yorkshire
Buildings and structures in the Metropolitan Borough of Rotherham